Sir Christopher Hilliard or Hildyard (1567 – November 1634) was an English landowner and politician who sat in the House of Commons at various times between 1589 and 1629.

Hilliard was the eldest son of Richard Hilliard of Routh, Yorkshire and his wife Jane Thweng, daughter of Marmaduke Thweng of Weaverthorpe. He was educated at St John's College, Cambridge in 1584 and entered Inner Temple in 1586. In 1589, he was elected Member of Parliament for Hedon. He was re-elected MP for Hedon in 1593 and 1597. He was a J.P. for the East Riding of Yorkshire by 1601. In 1601 he was re-elected MP for Hedon. He succeeded to the estates of his father and his uncle Christopher Hilliard in 1602.  He was knighted in  1603 and was a member of the council in the north from July 1603 to  November 1634. He was High Sheriff of Yorkshire from 1612 to 1613. In 1621 he was elected MP for Beverley. He was elected MP for Hedon again in 1624 and was re-elected in 1625 1626 and 1628, sitting until 1629 when King Charles decided to rule without parliament for eleven years. 
 
Hilliard died at the age of about 66 and was buried at Winestead on 23 November 1634.

Hilliard married  Elizabeth Welby, daughter of Henry Welby of Goxhill, Lincolnshire and his wife Alice White of Wallingwell on 13 July 1598. They had five sons and six daughters.

References

1567 births
1654 deaths
Alumni of St John's College, Cambridge
Members of the Inner Temple
Place of birth missing
High Sheriffs of Yorkshire
English MPs 1589
English MPs 1593
English MPs 1597–1598
English MPs 1601
English MPs 1604–1611
English MPs 1621–1622
English MPs 1624–1625
English MPs 1625
English MPs 1626
English MPs 1628–1629
Members of the Parliament of England for Hedon